The 2011 Tri Nations Series was the sixteenth annual Tri Nations rugby union series between the national rugby union teams of New Zealand, Australia and South Africa, respectively nicknamed the All Blacks, Wallabies and Springboks. It was also the last series in which only these three teams participated. In 2012, Argentina's Pumas joined this competition, which was rebranded as The Rugby Championship. This made this series the last under the Tri Nations name until 2020, when South Africa withdrew due to the COVID-19 pandemic.

The 2011 Rugby World Cup was held in New Zealand between 9 September and 23 October 2011. As a result, the 2011 Tri Nations was shortened to include only six games instead of the usual nine. Each team played the other two countries twice rather than three times. Australia won the series for the first time in ten years.

Standings

Fixtures
All times are local

Australia vs South Africa, Sydney

Touch judges:
Keith Brown (New Zealand)
Vinny Munro (New Zealand)
Television match official:
Matt Goddard (Australia)

New Zealand vs South Africa, Wellington

Touch judges:
Stuart Dickinson (Australia)
James Leckie (Australia)
Television match official:
Garratt Williamson (New Zealand)
 Dan Carter reclaimed the career lead in Test points from Jonny Wilkinson of England with his first penalty, ending the evening with 1,204 career points.

New Zealand vs Australia, Auckland

Touch judges:
Marius Jonker (South Africa)
Christie du Preez (South Africa)
Television match official:
Glen Jackson (New Zealand)

South Africa vs Australia, Durban

Touch judges:
George Clancy (Ireland)
Carlo Damasco (Italy)
Television match official:
Shaun Veldsman (South Africa)

 South Africa's starting XV had a total of 810 caps going into the match, an all-time record for the sport.

South Africa vs New Zealand, Port Elizabeth

Touch judges:
 Andrew Small (England)
 Carlo Damasco (Italy)
Television match official:
Johann Meuwesen (South Africa)
 This was the first time that a Tri Nations test was played in Port Elizabeth.
Source: Fox Sports
AllBlacks.com

Australia vs New Zealand, Brisbane

Touch judges:
 Craig Joubert (South Africa)
 Cobus Wessels (South Africa)
Television match official:
 Matt Goddard (Australia)

Player statistics

Leading try scorers

Leading point scorers

See also
 History of rugby union matches between Australia and South Africa
 History of rugby union matches between Australia and New Zealand
 History of rugby union matches between New Zealand and South Africa

References

External links
 All Blacks Tri Nations website
 Springboks Tri Nations website
 Wallabies Tri Nations website
 2011 Tri Nations Series Full Details

2011
2011 in South African rugby union
2011 in New Zealand rugby union
2011 in Australian rugby union
2011 rugby union tournaments for national teams